The Vancouver Wave are a Canadian rugby union team based in Vancouver, British Columbia. The team plays in the Rugby Canada National Junior Championship and draws most of its players from the Vancouver Rugby Union and the British Columbia Rugby Union, one of fourteen Rugby Unions that have rep teams in the RCSL.

The Wave play their "home" games at the Brockton Oval at Stanley Park in Vancouver.

The team played under the name BC Wave for the 2006 and 2007 RCSL seasons, but later switched back to using Vancouver Wave.

On August 1, 2009, the team won their first national championship. When they defeated the Toronto Rebellion 41–21.

On November 13, 2021, the Wave became the first Coastal Cup champions.

History
In 1998, Rugby Canada and the provincial unions agreed to form the Rugby Canada Super League. Fourteen unions and sub-unions were invited to compete in the new semi-professional league.

In 2009, Rugby Canada decided to disband the RCSL and replace it with a new U-20 league called the Rugby Canada National Junior Championship. The Wave was chosen as one of the remaining RCSL clubs to enter the newly formed league.

In 2021, forming to represent the Vancouver Rugby Union but without players playing representing UBC Men's Rugby and Van East Rugby, who were from the Burnaby Lake Rugby Club, the Vancouver Wave won the Inaugural Coastal Cup. The team went undefeated, winning six matches and losing none, defeating the Pacific Pride (rugby union) in the final match to seal the Grand Slam.

Management and coaches

Coastal Cup 2021 Squad

Season-by-season records

|-
| colspan="6" align="center" | Vancouver Wave
|-
|1998 || 3 || 3 || 0 || 6th West Division || --
|-
|1999 || 4 || 2 || 0 || 3rd West Division || --
|-
|2002 || 3 || 2 || 0 || 3rd West Division || --
|-
|2003 || 3 || 3 || 0 || 4th West Division || --
|-
|2004 || 4 || 2 || 0 || 2nd West Division || --
|-
|2005 || 2 || 4 || 0 || 5th West Division || --
|-
| colspan="6" align="center" | BC Wave
|-
|2006 || 1 || 3 || 0 || 4th West Division || --
|-
|2007 || 0 || 4 || 0 || 5th West Division || --
|-
| colspan="6" align="center" | Vancouver Wave
|-
|2008 || 1 || 3 || 0 || 5th West Division || --
|-
|2009 || 3 || 0 || 1 || 1st Pacific Division || Won West Final (Mavericks)Won Championship Final (Rebellion)
|-
!rowspan="3"|Totals || 24 || 26 || 1
|colspan="2"| (regular season, 1998–2009)
|-
! 2 || 0 || 0
|colspan="2"| (playoffs, 1998–2009)
|-

2021 Standings 
2021 Coastal Cup Champions

References

External links
 Coastal Cup Rugby

Sports teams in Vancouver
Rugby union teams in British Columbia